Asura inconspicua is a moth of the family Erebidae first described by Frederic Moore in 1878. It is found in the Nilgiri Mountains of India.

References

inconspicua
Moths described in 1878
Moths of Asia